Church of the Martyrs primarily refers to the Melitians, followers of Melitius of Lycopolis in North Africa in the fourth century (C.E.).

It may also refer to:

 Church of the Martyrs, Leicester, in Leicester, England, see Anglican churches in Leicester
 Church of the Martyrs, Raqqa, in Raqqa, Syria

See also
 Church of Croatian Martyrs, Čavoglave, in Čavoglave, Croatia
 Church of Croatian Martyrs, Udbina, in Udbina, Croatia
 Church of the Forty Martyrs of Sebaste, in Moscow, see List of churches in Moscow
 Church of the Holy Martyrs, Marrakech, in Marrakech, Morocco, see Roman Catholicism in Morocco
 Church of the Holy Martyrs, Taybat al-Imam, in Taybat al-Imam, Syria
 Church of the Irish Martyrs, in Letterkenny, Ireland
 Church of the Martyrs Adrian and Natalia, in Babushkin, see List of churches in Moscow
 Church of the Martyrs Fides, Spes, Caritas and their Mother Sophia, in Moscow, see List of churches in Moscow
 Church of the Martyrs Frol and Lavr, in Zatsep, see List of churches in Moscow
 Church of the Nine Martyrs of Cyzicus, in Moscow, see List of churches in Moscow
 Forty Martyrs Cathedral, in Aleppo, Syria
 Forty Martyrs Church, Rotherham, in the Parish of St Bede's Church, Rotherham, England
 Holy Forty Martyrs Church, Veliko Tarnovo  
 Martyrs' Free Church, in Edinburgh, Scotland, see George IV Bridge
 Forty Saints Monastery, Sarandë, in Albania